Karl Platen (6 March 1877 – 4 July 1952) was a German actor and cinematographer known for Girl in the Moon (1929) and M (1931).

Biography
Karl Platen was born as Carl Platen on March 6, 1877 in Halle an der Saale, Germany. He died on July 4, 1952 in Weimar, German Democratic Republic at the age of 75.

Selected filmography

 Ein Ausgestoßener (1913, part 1)
 Der Katzensteg (1915) - Pfarrer
 Die Erben des Geizhalses (1915) - Pflegesohn von Riedel Hermann 
 The Japanese Woman (1919)
 Hängezöpfchen (1919) - Prof. Hahnensporn
 Das rosa Strumpfbändchen (1919)
 The Boy in Blue (1919) - Alter Diener / Old servant
 The Foolish Heart (1919, Short)
 The Bodega of Los Cuerros (1919)
 Madame Du Barry (1919) - Guillaume Dubarry
 Der rote Sarafan (1919)
 Seine Beichte (Bekenntnisse eines Lebemannes) (1919) - Diener Franz
 Irrlicht (1919)

 The Golden Lie (1919)
 Die fremde Frau (1919)
 Der Mitternachtsassessor (1919)
 Only a Servant (1919)
 Zwischen Lachen und Weinen (1919) - Prof. Brodersen
 Love (1919) - Erster Sekretär bei Illing
 The Fairy of Saint Ménard (1919)
 The World Champion (1919)
 Der Weiberfeind (1919) - Arnold Knutschke
 The Last Sun Son (1919) - Prinz von Noowara
 The Heart of Casanova (1919)
 The Secret of the American Docks (1919) - Williams, Fakturist
 The Commandment of Love (1919)
 Devoted Artists (1919)
 All Souls (1919)
 Mary Magdalene (1920)
 Graf Sylvains Rache (1920) - Kammerdiener Jean
 Patience (1920) - Pfarrer
 Im Wirbel des Lebens (1920)
 The Princess of the Nile (1920) - Dr. Thesaurus
 Kri-Kri, the Duchess of Tarabac (1920)
 Der Schieberkönig (1920)
 The Eyes of the World (1920) - Prof. Hanous
 Fanny Elssler (1920)
 The White Peacock (1920)
 Der Henker von Sankt Marien (1920) - Stadtschreiber
 Catherine the Great (1920) - Feldmarschall Schwerin
 Anna Boleyn (1920) - Physician
 President Barrada (1920)
 Der langsame Tod (1920)
 Materia - Club der Toten (1920)
 The Bull of Olivera (1921) - De Barrios' Diener Lopez
 Hannerl and Her Lovers (1921)
 The Secret of the Mummy (1921) - Dr. Hollowan
 Count Varenne's Lover (1921)
 Susanne Stranzky (1921)
 Hazard (1921)
 Das Opfer der Ellen Larsen (1921) - Dr. Hennings, Arzt
 Playing with Fire (1921)
 Junge Mama (1921) - Kammerherr
 The Inheritance of Tordis (1921) - Schuster
 Der Silberkönig (1921, part 1-4)
 Das gestohlene Millionenrezept (1921) - Kriminalbeamter
 The Story of a Maid (1921) - Beamter
 The Story of Christine von Herre (1921)
 A Debt of Honour (1921) - Arzt
 Destiny (1921) - the apothecary
 Baron Bunnys Erlebnisse (1921, part 1)
 Lady Hamilton (1921) - Kammerdiener des Königs
 Mysteries of India (1921, part 1) - Rowlands Diener / Servant (uncredited)
 The Eternal Struggle (1921) - Diener
 The Passenger in Compartment Seven (1921)
 Fridericus Rex (1922-1923, part 2-4) - Kammerdiener \ sFredersdorff
 The Lost House (1922)
 Dr. Mabuse: The Gambler (1922) - Diener Tolds (uncredited)
 Maciste und die Javanerin (1922)
 Im Kampf mit dem unsichtbaren Feind (1922) - Professor Curtius
 Die fünf Frankfurter (1922) - Samuel
 Tabitha, Stand Up (1922)
 Jussuf el Fanit, der Wüstenräuber (1922)
 Der Kampf ums Ich (1922)
 Rivals (1923)
 The Last Battle (1923)
 Die Buddenbrooks (1923) - Pokurist
 Tatjana (1923)
 Warning Shadows (1923) - 2. Diener
 His Wife, The Unknown (1923) - Sam
 Die Radio Heirat (1924)
 Steuerlos (1924)
 The Secret Agent (1924) - Baumeister
 Debit and Credit (1924) - Diener des Barons
 Garragan (1924)
 The Stolen Professor (1924)
 Husbands or Lovers (1924)
 Deutsche Helden in schwerer Zeit (1924) - Marschall Blücher
 Lord Reginald's Derby Ride (1924)
 The Wig (1925) - Der alte Diener
 If Only It Weren't Love (1925)
 The Venus of Montmartre (1925) - Mon. Frossart
 The Flower Girl of Potsdam Square (1925) - Vorsitzender
 Express Train of Love (1925)
 What the Stones Tell (1925)
 The Dice Game of Life (1925) - Sein Diener
 The Old Ballroom (1925)
 The Telephone Operator (1925) - Jeff
 Love Story (1925)
 Shadows of the Metropolis (1925) - Diener bei Bernard
 The Adventure of Mr. Philip Collins (1926)
 Two and a Lady (1926) - Polizeirat Krag
 People to Each Other (1926) - Gefängnisgeistlicher
 Die Wiskottens (1926) - Vater Wiskotten
 Trude (1926)
 I Lost My Heart in Heidelberg (1926) - Georg Schröder - Corpsdiener
 The Golden Butterfly (1926) - Ein Oberkellner
 The Blue Danube (1926) - Florian Staudinger, Schuhmachermeister
 Des Königs Befehl (1926)
 Children of No Importance (1926) - Polizei
 The Sweet Girl (1926)
 Fadette (1926)
 State Attorney Jordan (1926)
 A Modern Dubarry (1926) - Diener
 Wenn Menschen irren. Frauen auf Irrwegen (1926)
 Violantha (1928) - Jeremias Zureich / Kneipenwirt / ihr Onkel
 Love (1927) - Diener
 The Man with the Counterfeit Money (1927)
 The Mistress (1927)
 Forbidden Love (1927) - Haushofmeister
 Flirtation (1927) - Franz, Lobmeiers Diener
 A Murderous Girl (1927)
 On the Banks of the River Weser (1927)
 Eva and the Grasshopper (1927)
 My Heidelberg, I Can Not Forget You (1927) - Georg Schröder, der Vater
 Grand Hotel (1927)
 Storm Tide (1927)
 Did You Fall in Love Along the Beautiful Rhine? (1927) - Dr. Birkel
 Le roman d'un jeune homme pauvre (1927)
 One Plus One Equals Three (1927) - Diener
 Wer wirft den ersten Stein? (1927)
 Der alte Fritz (1928, part 2) - Kammerhusar Strützky
 Luther (1928) - Bruder Franziskus
 Scampolo (1928) - Hotelportier
 The Runaway Girl (1928) - Franz, Diener im Hause Thoms
 Cry for Help (1928)
 Love's Masquerade (1928) - Diener
 In Werder blühen die Bäume... - Die Geschichte zweier lustiger Berliner Jungen (1928) - Droschkenkutscher Gustav
 His Strongest Weapon (1928) - Anders, Mann mit dem Zigarrenladen
 Sir or Madam (1928)
 Rasputin (1928) - Sawely, der Diener
 Her Dark Secret (1929) - Nachtportier
 The Burning Heart (1929)
 Asphalt (1929)
 Miss Midshipman (1929) - Hauswart
 The Hero of Every Girl's Dream (1929)
 Foolish Happiness (1929)
 Dawn (1929) - Berthold, ein Hauer
 The Black Domino (1929) - Jean, Diener
 Narkose (1929)
 Madame Lu (1929)
 Girl in the Moon (1929) - Der Mann am Mikrophon
 Wenn du einmal dein Herz verschenkst (1929)
 It's You I Have Loved (1929) - Kecgber
 Roses Bloom on the Moorland (1929) - Schäfer
 Nacht vor dem Tode (1929)
 Don Manuel, der Bandit (1929)
 The Immortal Vagabond (1930)
 End of the Rainbow (1930)
 Die Jugendgeliebte (1930)
 Rag Ball (1930) - Karl
 The Great Longing (1930) - Fridericus Rex
 Die Lindenwirtin (1930) - Rektor der Universität Bonn
 A Student's Song of Heidelberg (1930)
 Love's Carnival (1930)
 Wie werde ich reich und glücklich? (1930)
 The Land of Smiles (1930) - Eine alte Exzellenz / ein alter Chinese in der Operette
 Two People (1930) - Der Diener Florian
 Road to Rio (1931)
 Student Life in Merry Springtime (1931) - Der Professor
 Her Grace Commands (1931) - Kammerdiener
 M (1931) - Damowitz
 The Golden Anchor (1932)
 Durchlaucht amüsiert sich (1932) - Zeremonienmeister
 The Countess of Monte Cristo (1932) - Nachtportier
 The Dancer of Sanssouci (1932) - Fredersdorff
 Theodor Körner (1932)
 Eine von uns (1932)
 Spell of the Looking Glass (1932) - Lehmkuhl, Chefarzt im Gefängnislazarett
 Das Lied der Schwarzen Berge (1933)
 Anna and Elizabeth (1933) - Dorfarzt
 The Testament of Dr. Mabuse (1933)
 Glück im Schloß (1933) - Haushofmeister Hofbauer
 Du sollst nicht begehren... (1933) - Der Pfarrer
 The Love Hotel (1933) - Arzt
 The Voice of Love (1934) - Der Korrepetitor
 Elisabeth and the Fool (1934) - Ein Kanzleischreiber
 Such a Rascal (1934) - Oertel, Pedell
 Es tut sich was um Mitternacht (1934) - Gastwirt
 The Black Whale (1934) - Ein alter Schiffer
 The World Without a Mask (1934)
 My Heart Calls You (1934)
 Gypsy Blood (1934) - Zweiter Geiger
 Hanneles Himmelfahrt (1934) - Pleschke
 Music in the Blood (1934)
 Master of the World (1934) - Diener Josef
 Schwarzer Jäger Johanna (1934)
 Miss Liselott (1934) - Diener bei Osterloh
 Polish Blood (1934) - Constanty
 The Last Waltz (1934) - Grischa, Diener
 Invitation to the Dance (1934) - Schneider-Kakadu
 Hearts are Trumps (1934) - Ein Diener
 Don't Lose Heart, Suzanne! (1935)
 Ein falscher Fuffziger (1935) - Kampe, Kassierer
 Knockout (1935) - Der Inspizient
 An Ideal Husband (1935) - Phips, Diener bei Goring
 Liebesträume (1935) - Jancsi, Diener bei Duday
 The Young Count (1935) - Professor Dodereit
 Der schüchterne Casanova (1936)
 Paul and Pauline (1936)
 The Hour of Temptation (1936) - Logenschließer in der Oper
 The Beggar Student (1936) - Stefan, Diener der Gräfin
 Männer vor der Ehe (1936)
 Ave Maria (1936) - Theaterinspizient
 The Unknown (1936) - Diener bei Platen
 The Night With the Emperor (1936) - Intendant des Erfurter Stadttheaters
 Ball at the Metropol (1937) - Werner, Diener
 Fridericus (1937) - Fredersdorf
 His Best Friend (1937) - Beamter im Inseratenbüro
 Love Can Lie (1937) - (uncredited)
 Gabriele: eins, zwei, drei (1937) - Konsulatsdiener
 Manege (1937)
 The Irresistible Man (1937) - Mitarbeiter der Vallier-Werke
 Monika (1938) - Diener
 Das große Abenteuer (1938)
 Petermann ist dagegen (1938) - Onkel Ernst' - Steward KdF.-Damper 'Der Deutsche
 Rätsel um Beate (1938)
 Faded Melody (1938) - Karl, Diener
 The Secret Lie (1938) - Konzertsaaldiener
 Grossalarm (1938)
 Frühlingsluft (1938)
 People Who Travel (1938) - Registrarbeamter
 You and I (1938)
 Napoleon Is to Blame for Everything (1938) - Angestellter im Pariser Theater (uncredited)
 Dance on the Volcano (1938) - Prinz Louis Philippes Diener Theodor (uncredited)
 Men, Animals and Sensations (1938)- Briefträger
 Der grüne Kaiser (1939) - (uncredited)
 Der vierte kommt nicht (1939)
 Robert Koch (1939) - Herr Kruhlke
 Brand im Ozean (1939) - Diener Pueblo
 We Danced Around the World (1939) - Werner, Sekretär
  (1940) - Lemoniers Diener
 Fahrt ins Leben (1940) - Pfandleiher
  (1941) - Regisseur am Apollo-Theater (uncredited)
 Tanz mit dem Kaiser (1941)
 Sonntagskinder (1941) - Oberkellner Max
 Rembrandt (1942)
 Diesel (1942) - Der Büroangestellte im Vorraum bei Krupp
 Meine Frau Teresa (1942)
 Du gehörst zu mir (1943)
 The Eternal Tone (1943) - Diener
 Romance in a Minor Key (1943) - Michael's servant
 Kollege kommt gleich (1943) - Ein bei der Damenwahl erwählter Tänzer
 Die Feuerzangenbowle (1944) - Minor Role (uncredited)
 Das schwarze Schaf (1944)
 The Man in the Saddle (1945) - Gastwirt
 Free Land (1946)
 Der Posaunist (1949) - Franz Bittrich, 1. Posaunist (final film role)

Bibliography
 Jung, Uli & Schatzberg, Walter. Beyond Caligari: The Films of Robert Wiene. Berghahn Books, 1999.

External links

1877 births
1952 deaths
German male film actors
German male silent film actors
People from Halle (Saale)
20th-century German male actors